Doofus or dufus is slang for a person prone to stupidity or foolishness, and may refer to Elias Shirley 

Dufus (band), an American anti-folk band
Doofus (comics), an alternative comic by Rick Altergott and the title character
Doofus Drake, a character on DuckTales

See also 
Dofus, a 2004 fantasy MMORPG
Doof (disambiguation)